Relay For Life is a community-based fundraising event for the American Cancer Society. Each year, more than 5,000 Relay For Life events take place in over twenty countries. Events are held in local communities, university campuses and in virtual campaigns.  As the American Cancer Society's most successful fundraiser and the organization's signature event, the mission of Relay For Life is to raise funds to improve cancer survival, decrease the incidence of cancer, and improve the quality of life for cancer patients and their caretakers.

A Relay For Life event is organized under a volunteer Relay Committee and implemented by volunteers. It is often organized as a multi-day public gathering, spanning all day and night in a large outdoor space, and many people bring tents and camp out around the walking tracks. Currently, almost 4 million people take part in Relay events in over 5,000 communities in the United States.

It is estimated that Relay For Life events have raised nearly $5 billion to date.  The first team to raise over $1 million was the Rosebud Miners. The largest virtual fundraising event is Relay For Life of Second Life, which has raised more than $4,000,000 since 2005.

The following countries hold Relay For Life events: Australia, Belgium, Bermuda, Canada, France, Denmark, Guatemala, Honduras, Ireland, Jamaica,  Japan, Luxembourg, Malaysia, Netherlands, New Zealand, Philippines, Portugal, South Africa, United Kingdom, United States and Zambia.

Origin 
In May 1985, Gordon Klatt, a colorectal surgeon from Tacoma, Washington, decided he wanted to raise money for the American Cancer Society. Because he enjoyed marathons, Klatt walked around the track at Baker Stadium at the University of Puget Sound in Tacoma for 24 hours. Throughout the night, friends paid $25 to run or walk 30 minutes with him. He walked approximately 83 miles and raised $27,000 for cancer research. Nearly 300 of Klatt's friends, family, and patients watched as he ran and walked the course. After this event, Klatt thought about how other people could participate in a similar event in their own community. He recruited a small team of people to host the City of Destiny Classic 24-Hour Run Against Cancer.

Countries and their names 
Many countries participate with their own names for their events.

Features 

Although all Relays vary, there are a few common features:
 A Survivor Dinner
 A Survivor Lap, which starts the Relay event.
 An Opening Lap, in which all the participants take a lap around the track  
 A Luminaria Ceremony, usually with a candlelight vigil 
A Closing Ceremony, including a final lap for all participants. Awards are given to teams for various achievements, such as most laps walked and most money raised.
 A "Fight Back" Ceremony, in which participants pledge to take specific actions against cancer.

Survivor Lap and Survivor Dinner 

The American Cancer Society defines a cancer survivor as anyone who has been diagnosed with cancer. At most Relay events, a Survivor Dinner is held for survivors in the community. The Survivor Lap, which is often the first lap of a Relay event, is used to identify the survivors. At some events, survivors are invited to speak at Relay events to encourage those with cancer.

Luminaria Ceremony 
At Relay For Life, participants celebrate survivors and remember those lost to the disease. The Luminaria Ceremony is targeted toward remembering. During this time, participants are asked to gather and honor those who have survived cancer and to remember those who have died from cancer. Luminaria bags are often decorated by participants. These bags are often then placed around the track and candles inside the bags are lit before the start of the Luminaria Ceremony. At some Relay events, pictures of cancer patients are shown as songs and readings are delivered.

Closing Ceremony 
The Closing Ceremony, held toward the end of Relay events, is when participants pledge to take action and spread awareness of cancer research, treatments, and prevention. Participants are encouraged to hold events in the community to increase awareness of smoking cessation, routine screenings, general cancer awareness and volunteer opportunities. A representative from the American Cancer Society Cancer Action Network (ACS CAN) may come to a Relay event and speak about cancer prevention bills and legislation that are trying to be passed as well as encourage ACS CAN participation.

Funds 
The American Cancer Society states that money raised through Relay For Life events goes to the following efforts:
Research grants and research programs
Prevention programs
Community and patient support programs
Detection and treatment programs
Fundraising
Construction of Hope Lodges

According to a study conducted by The American Cancer Society in 2013, the following was noted for how funds raised by Relay For Life have impacted communities nationwide:
Saved Patients more than $38 million in lodging costs by providing a free place to stay through the Hope Lodge program
Provided more than 380,000 rides to and from treatment or medical appointments
Contributed to a 50% drop in smoking since 1946
Marked a 20% decline in cancer-related deaths since 1991. That means more than 1.3 million lives saved.

See also
 American Cancer Society

References

External links
Official Relay For Life Website
American Cancer Society Relay For Life
Relay For Life International

Cancer fundraisers
American Cancer Society